Harry Potter and the Half-Blood Prince is a fantasy novel written by British author J. K. Rowling and the sixth and penultimate novel in the Harry Potter series. Set during Harry Potter's sixth year at Hogwarts, the novel explores the past of the boy wizard's nemesis, Lord Voldemort, and Harry's preparations for the final battle against Voldemort alongside his headmaster and mentor Albus Dumbledore.

The book was published in the United Kingdom by Bloomsbury and in the United States by Scholastic on 16 July 2005, as well as in several other countries. It sold nine million copies in the first 24 hours after its release, a record eventually broken by its sequel, Harry Potter and the Deathly Hallows. There were many controversies before and after it was published, including the right-to-read copies delivered before the release date in Canada. Reception to the novel was generally positive, and it won several awards and honours, including the 2006 British Book of the Year award.

Reviewers noted that the book had a darker tone than its predecessors, though it did contain some humour. Some considered the main themes love, death, trust, and redemption. The considerable character development of Harry and many other teenage characters also drew attention.

Plot

Following his godfather Sirius Black's death, Harry is visited by Dumbledore, who escorts him to the home of the Weasleys. They take a detour to meet Horace Slughorn, whom Dumbledore wishes to return to Hogwarts school to teach Potions. Slughorn is reluctant but agrees after realising he will teach the famous Harry Potter.

At Hogwarts, Severus Snape is announced as the new Defence Against the Dark Arts instructor. Harry, who had neglected to buy Potions supplies, must borrow an old textbook to attend Slughorn's class. He finds an old, tattered book bearing the inscription 'The Half-Blood Prince.' Harry notices that the scribbled tips inside the book yield better results than the printed instruction and continues to use the book afterward. He rises to the top of the class, with Slughorn attributing his Potions skill to be a trait inherited from his mother Lily.

Meanwhile, Dumbledore educates Harry about the past of Tom Riddle, aka Voldemort, to prepare him for their foretold battle. He shows Harry memories of people who met Riddle, including one of Slughorn when he was a professor. The memory has been altered, and Dumbledore wants Harry to retrieve the real one from Slughorn. Harry begins attending meetings of the Slug Club, an informal group of Slughorn's favourite students. Hermione and Ginny are also invited, though Ron is excluded. 

Hermione asks Ron to go to Slughorn's Christmas party with her, but he is still upset with her for her past with Viktor Krum. He makes out with Lavender Brown after a Quidditch match and starts going out with her instead. Harry attends the party with Luna Lovegood but eventually leaves when Draco Malfoy is found gatecrashing the event. Following the holidays, Ron is poisoned on his birthday after drinking mead originally meant as a gift for Dumbledore. He survives but is dumped by Lavender for spending more time with Hermione after the incident. 

Harry finally uses the Luck Potion ('Felix Felicis') to extract the unaltered memory from Slughorn. It reveals that Tom Riddle created six Horcruxes to make himself immortal. Horcruxes, magical objects encasing one's soul, are an ancient form of dark magic. Dumbledore believes two have already been destroyed but that at least four remain. He lists them to Harry, then summons him one evening, claiming to have found another. Together they journey to a cave, where a Horcrux is found to be hidden under protective enchantments in the middle of a lake. 

Dumbledore nearly dies retrieving the object, then returns with Harry to Hogwarts. Seeing the Dark Mark above the Astronomy Tower, the two ascend it. Hearing footsteps, Dumbledore puts a protective spell on Harry, who is forced to watch as Draco disarms Dumbledore silently. Draco claims responsibility for trying to kill Dumbledore, on Voldemort's orders, throughout the school year but cannot bring himself to do it now. Snape comes to the top of the tower and fires a Killing Curse at Dumbledore instead. 

Released from Dumbledore's protection, Harry chases after Snape and tries to use a spell on him, which Snape easily deflects. Harry is knocked down, and Snape taunts Harry for using his spells against him. He reveals himself to be the Half-Blood Prince, then escapes with Draco. Dumbledore's body is found at the bottom of the Astronomy Tower. His funeral is held on Hogwarts grounds and is attended by members of all wizarding races. Harry discovers that the Horcrux they retrieved was a fake and vows to find and destroy the remaining ones. Ron and Hermione promise to help him.

Development

Franchise
Harry Potter and the Half-Blood Prince is the sixth book in the Harry Potter series. The first book in the series, Harry Potter and the Philosopher's Stone, was first published by Bloomsbury in 1997, with an initial print-run of 500 copies in hardback, 300 of which were distributed to libraries. By the end of 1997, the UK edition won a National Book Award and a gold medal in the 9- to 11-year-olds category of the Nestlé Smarties Book Prize. The second book, Harry Potter and the Chamber of Secrets, was initially published in the UK on 2 July 1998 and in the US on 2 June 1999. Harry Potter and the Prisoner of Azkaban was then published a year later in the UK on 8 July 1999 and in the US on 8 September 1999. Harry Potter and the Goblet of Fire was published on 8 July 2000 at the same time by Bloomsbury and Scholastic. Harry Potter and the Order of the Phoenix, the longest novel in the Harry Potter series, was released 21 June 2003. After the publishing of Harry Potter and the Half-Blood Prince, the seventh and final novel, Harry Potter and the Deathly Hallows, was released 21 July 2007. The book sold 11 million copies within 24 hours of its release: 2.7 million copies in the UK and 8.3 million in the US.

Background

Rowling stated that she had Harry Potter and the Half-Blood Prince "planned for years," but she spent two months revisiting her plan before she began writing the story's first draft. This was a lesson learned after she did not check the plan for Goblet of Fire and had to rewrite an entire third of the book. She started writing the book before her second child, David, was born, but she took a break to care for him. The first chapter, "The Other Minister", which features meetings between the Muggle Prime Minister, Minister for Magic Cornelius Fudge, and his successor, Rufus Scrimgeour, was a concept Rowling tried to start in Philosopher's Stone, Prisoner of Azkaban, and Order of the Phoenix, but she found "it finally works" in Half-Blood Prince. She stated that she was "seriously upset" writing the end of the book, although Goblet of Fire was the hardest to write. When asked if she liked the book, she responded, "I like it better than I liked Goblet, Phoenix or Chamber when I finished them. Book six does what I wanted it to do and even if nobody else likes it (and some won't), I know it will remain one of my favourites of the series. Ultimately you have to please yourself before you please anyone else!"

Rowling revealed the title of Half-Blood Prince on her website on 24 June 2004. This was the title she had once considered for the second book, Chamber of Secrets, though she decided the information disclosed belonged later on in the story. On 21 December 2004, she announced she had finished writing it, along with the release date of 16 July. Bloomsbury unveiled the cover on 8 March 2005.

Controversies
The record-breaking publication of Half-Blood Prince was accompanied by controversy. In May 2005, bookmakers in the UK suspended bets on which main character would die in the book amid fears of insider knowledge. A number of high-value bets were made on the death of Albus Dumbledore, many coming from the town of Bungay where it was believed the books were being printed at the time. Betting was later reopened. Additionally, in response to Greenpeace's campaign on using forest friendly paper for big-name authors, Bloomsbury published the book on 30% recycled paper.

Right-to-read controversy
In early July 2005, a Real Canadian Superstore in Coquitlam, British Columbia, Canada, accidentally sold fourteen copies of The Half-Blood Prince before the authorised release date. The Canadian publisher, Raincoast Books, obtained an injunction from the Supreme Court of British Columbia that prohibited the purchasers from reading the books before the official release date or discussing the contents. Purchasers were offered Harry Potter T-shirts and autographed copies of the book if they returned their copies before 16 July.

On 15 July, less than twelve hours before the book went on sale in the Eastern time zone, Raincoast warned The Globe and Mail newspaper that publishing a review from a Canada-based writer at midnight, as the paper had promised, would be seen as a violation of the trade secret injunction. The injunction sparked a number of news articles alleging that the injunction had restricted fundamental rights. Canadian law professor Michael Geist posted commentary on his blog. Richard Stallman called for a boycott and requested the publisher issue an apology. The Globe and Mail published a review from two UK-based writers in its 16 July edition and posted the Canadian writer's review on its website at 9:00 that morning. Commentary was also provided on the Raincoast website.

Style and themes
Some reviewers noted that Half-Blood Prince contained a darker tone than the previous Potter novels. The Christian Science Monitor reviewer Yvonne Zipp argued the first half contained a lighter tone to soften the unhappy ending. The Boston Globe reviewer Liz Rosenberg wrote, "lightness [is] slimmer than ever in this darkening series...[there is] a new charge of gloom and darkness. I felt depressed by the time I was two-thirds of the way through." She also compared the setting to Charles Dickens's depictions of London as it was "brooding, broken, gold-lit, as living a character as any other." Christopher Paolini called the darker tone "disquieting" because it was so different from the earlier books. Liesl Schillinger, a contributor to The New York Times book review, also noted that Half-Blood Prince was "far darker" but "leavened with humor, romance and snappy dialogue." She suggested a connection to the 11 September attacks, as the later, darker novels were written after that event. David Kipen, a critic of the San Francisco Chronicle, considered the "darkness as a sign of our paranoid times" and singled out curfews and searches that were part of the tightened security at Hogwarts as resemblances to our world.

Julia Keller, a critic for the Chicago Tribune, highlighted the humour found in the novel and claimed it to be the success of the Harry Potter saga. She acknowledged that "the books are dark and scary in places" but "no darkness in Half-Blood Prince...is so immense that it cannot be rescued by a snicker or a smirk." She considered that Rowling was suggesting difficult times can be worked through with imagination, hope, and humour and compared this concept to works such as Madeleine L'Engle's A Wrinkle in Time and Kenneth Grahame's The Wind in the Willows.

Rosenberg wrote that the two main themes of Half-Blood Prince were love and death and praised Rowling's "affirmation of their central position in human lives." She considered love to be represented in several forms: the love of parent to child, teacher to student, and the romances that developed between the main characters. Zipp noted trust and redemption to be themes promising to continue in the final book, which she thought "would add a greater layer of nuance and complexity to some characters who could sorely use it." Deepti Hajela also pointed out Harry's character development, that he was "no longer a boy wizard; he's a young man, determined to seek out and face a young man's challenges." Paolini had similar views, claiming, "the children have changed...they act like real teenagers."

Publication and reception

Critical reception
Harry Potter and the Half-Blood Prince was met with positive reviews. Liesl Schillinger of The New York Times praised the novel's various themes and suspenseful ending. However, she considered Rowling's gift "not so much for language as for characterisation and plotting." Kirkus Reviews said it "will leave readers pleased, amused, excited, scared, infuriated, delighted, sad, surprised, thoughtful and likely wondering where Voldemort has got to, since he appears only in flashbacks." They considered Rowling's "wry wit" to turn into "outright merriment" but called the climax "tragic, but not uncomfortably shocking." Yvonne Zipp of The Christian Science Monitor praised the way Rowling evolved Harry into a teenager and how the plot threads found as far back as Chamber of Secrets came into play. On the other hand, she noted it "gets a little exposition-heavy in spots," and older readers may have seen the ending coming.

The Boston Globe correspondent Liz Rosenberg wrote, "The book bears the mark of genius on every page" and praised the imagery and darker tone of the book, considering that the series could be crossing over from fantasy to horror. The Associated Press writer Deepti Hajela praised the newfound emotional tones and ageing Harry to the point at which "younger fans may find [the series] has grown up too much." Emily Green, a staff writer for the Los Angeles Times, was generally positive about the book but was concerned whether young children could handle the material. Cultural critic Julia Keller of the Chicago Tribune called it the "most eloquent and substantial addition to the series thus far" and considered the key to the success of the Potter novels to be humour.

Awards and honours
Harry Potter and the Half-Blood Prince won several awards, including the 2006 British Book of the Year Award and the 2006 Royal Mail Award for Scottish Children's Books for ages 8–12 in its native United Kingdom. In the United States, the American Library Association listed it among its 2006 Best Books for Young Adults. It won both the 2005 reader-voted Quill Awards for Best Book of the Year and Best Children's Book. It also won the Oppenheim Toy Portfolio Platinum Seal for notable book.

Sales

Before publication, 1.4 million pre-orders were placed for Half-Blood Prince on Amazon.com, breaking the record held by the previous novel, Order of the Phoenix, with 1.3 million. The initial print run for Half-Blood Prince was a record-breaking 10.8 million. Within the first 24 hours after release, the book sold 9 million copies worldwide: 2 million in the UK and about 6.9 million in the US, which prompted Scholastic to rush an additional 2.7 million copies into print. Within the first nine weeks of publication, 11 million copies of the US edition were reported to have been sold. The US audiobook, read by Jim Dale, set sales records with 165,000 sold over two days, besting the adaptation of Order of the Phoenix by twenty percent.

Translations

Harry Potter and the Half-Blood Prince was published simultaneously in the UK, US, Canada, Australia, New Zealand, and South Africa. Along with the rest of the books in the Harry Potter series, it was eventually translated into 67 languages. However, because of high security surrounding the manuscript, translators did not get to start on translating Half-Blood Prince until its English release date, and the earliest were not expected to be released until the fall of 2005. In Germany, a group of "hobby translators" translated the book via the internet less than two days after release, long before German translator Klaus Fritz could translate and publish the book.

Editions

Since its wide hardcover release on 16 July 2005, Half-Blood Prince was released as a paperback on 23 June 2006 in the UK. Two days later on 25 July, the paperback edition was released in Canada and the US, where it had an initial print run of 2 million copies. To celebrate the release of the American paperback edition, Scholastic held a six-week sweepstakes event in which participants in an online poll were entered to win prizes. Simultaneous to the original hardcover release was the UK adult edition that featured a new cover and was also released as a paperback on 23 June. Also released on 16 July was the Scholastic "Deluxe Edition," which featured reproductions of Mary GrandPré's artwork and had a print run of about 100,000 copies. Bloomsbury later released a paperback "Special Edition" on 6 July 2009 and a "Signature Edition" paperback on 1 November 2010.

Adaptations

Film 

The film adaptation of the sixth book was originally scheduled to be released on 21 November 2008 but was changed to 15 July 2009. Directed by David Yates, the screenplay was adapted by Steve Kloves and produced by David Heyman and David Barron. The film grossed over $934 million worldwide, which made it the second-highest-grossing film of 2009 worldwide and the fifteenth-highest of all time. Additionally, Half-Blood Prince gained an Academy Award nomination for Best Cinematography.

Video games 

A video game adaptation of the book was developed by EA Bright Light Studio and published by Electronic Arts in 2009. The game was available on the Microsoft Windows, Nintendo DS, PlayStation 2, PlayStation 3, PlayStation Portable, Wii, Xbox 360, and macOS platforms.

The book was also adapted in the 2011 video game Lego Harry Potter: Years 5–7.

References

External links

2005 British novels
2005 children's books
2005 fantasy novels
BILBY Award-winning works
Bloomsbury Publishing books
British Book Award-winning works
British novels adapted into films
06
Fiction set in 1996
Fiction set in 1997
Scholastic Corporation books
Sequel novels
Children's fantasy novels